Protein CWC15 homolog is a protein that in humans is encoded by the CWC15 gene.

Interactions
CWC15 has been shown to interact with CDC5L.

References

External links

Further reading